Shawnee Peak may refer to:

 Pleasant Mountain Ski Area, Maine, formerly known as Shawnee Peak Ski Area (1988–2022)
 Shawnee Peak (Alaska)
 Shawnee Peak (Colorado)